Burger King is a major international fast food restaurant chain and corporation.
 
Burger King may also refer to:

 The Burger King, mascot of the major fast food restaurant chain
 Burger King (Mattoon, Illinois), a single location fast food restaurant unaffiliated with the major corporation
 Burger King (Alberta), a defunct fast food chain unaffiliated with the major corporation

See also

Burger Kings
Burger Queen